A goat is a mammal.

Goat or goats may also refer to:

Animals
 Capra (genus) or wild goats, a genus of species including goats, ibexes, and others
 Mountain goat, Oreamnos americanus, a North American animal commonly but not expertly considered to be a wild goat
 Wild goat, Capra aegagrus, the species from which the domestic goat was bred

Places
 Goat Buttes, California
 Goat Creek (disambiguation)
 Goat Fell, Isle of Arran, Scotland
 Goat Island (disambiguation)
 Goat Lake (Glacier County, Montana)
 Goat Lake (Sawtooth Wilderness), a glacial lake in Custer County, Idaho
 Goat Mountain (disambiguation)
 Goat River (disambiguation)

Arts, entertainment, and media

Films
 Goat (2015 film), a 2015 Slovak film
 Goat (2016 film), a 2016 American film
 Goats (film), a 2012 film
 The Goat (1917 film), starring Oliver Hardy
 The Goat (1918 film), starring Fred Stone
 The Goat (1921 film), starring Buster Keaton

Literature
 Goats (novel), a 2000 novel by Mark Jude Poirier
 Goats (webcomic), by Jonathan Rosenberg
 The Goat, or Who Is Sylvia?, a 2002 play by Edward Albee

Music

Groups
 Goat (band), a Swedish alternative band 
 The Goats, a hip hop group

Albums
 Goat (album), a 1991 album by The Jesus Lizard
 G.O.A.T. (LL Cool J album), 2000
 G.O.A.T. (Diljit Dosanjh album), 2020
 The Goat (album), a 2020 album by Polo G
 The Goat, a 2011 album by Inkubus Sukkubus

Other uses in arts, entertainment, and media
 CKLM-FM, a radio station branded as "106.1 The Goat"
 WXYG, a radio station branded as "Album Rock 540, The Goat"
 "The Goat" (How I Met Your Mother), a 2008 episode of the U.S. television sitcom
 GOATS, a team composition for the video game Overwatch centered on the playable character Brigitte

Vehicles
 Goat, a South Devon Railway 0-4-0 Owl class steam locomotive
 Gama Goat, a small, articulated cargo vehicle used by the US Army
 Pontiac GTO, an American muscle car
 Sandlin Goat, a glider

Zodiac
 Goat (zodiac), sign in the Chinese zodiac
 Capricornus, a sign in the western zodiac as a sea-goat

Other uses
 Goat (musician), stage name for American singer Andy Rosen
 The Goat, Kensington, a pub in London
 Galveston Orientation and Amnesia Test, a neurological test
 G.O.A.T. or GOAT, Greatest of All Time (disambiguation)
 Goating, a strategy in roller derby
 Government of All the Talents or the Ministry of All the Talents, an 1806  British ministry

See also
 
 Goatse.cx, an Internet shock site
 Gat (disambiguation)
 Got (disambiguation)
 Pan (god), A Greek god with goat-like features